Edward Barcik (born 31 May 1950) is a retired Polish cyclist. He had his best achievements in the 100 km  team time trial, namely a silver medal at the 1972 Summer Olympics and a bronze medal at the 1971 UCI Road World Championships. Individually he won the Tour of Małopolska in 1972 and Szlakiem Grodów Piastowskich in 1975. He was awarded the Polish Cross of Merit.

After retiring from competitions he worked as a cycling coach and organizer of youth competitions. In December 1981, he moved to Hanau, Germany. He is married and has two daughters.

References 

1950 births
Living people
Cyclists at the 1972 Summer Olympics
Olympic cyclists of Poland
Polish male cyclists
Olympic silver medalists for Poland
Olympic medalists in cycling
Sportspeople from Lower Silesian Voivodeship
Medalists at the 1972 Summer Olympics
People from Złotoryja County